The Hyperiidea are a suborder of amphipods, small aquatic crustaceans.  Unlike the other suborders of Amphipoda, hyperiids are exclusively marine and do not occur in fresh water. Hyperiids are distinguished by their large eyes and planktonic habitat. Most species of hyperiids are parasites or predators of salps and jellyfish in the plankton, although Themisto gaudichaudii and a few relatives are free-swimming predators of copepods and other small planktonic animals.

Gallery

Taxonomy
According to Vinogradov et al. in 1996, 233 species of Hyperiidea are known.

Some controversy exists as to the number of families in the Hyperiidea, being given as between 20 and 23 depending on whether groups like the Thaumatopsidae are considered distinct or not. The taxonomy of Hyperiidea currently accepted by the World Register of Marine Species is as follows:

Infraorder Physocephalata Bowman & Gruner, 1973
 Parvorder Physocephalatidira Bowman & Gruner, 1973
 Superfamily Phronimoidea Rafinesque, 1815
 Family Bougisidae Zeidler, 2004
 Family Cystisomatidae Willemöes-Suhm, 1875
 Family Dairellidae Bovallius, 1887
 Family Hyperiidae Dana, 1852
 Family Iulopididae Zeidler, 2004
 Family Lestrigonidae Zeidler, 2004
 Family Phronimidae Rafinesque, 1815
 Family Phrosinidae Dana, 1852
 Superfamily Platysceloidea Spence Bate, 1862
 Family Amphithyridae Zeidler, 2016
 Family Anapronoidae Bowman & Gruner, 1973
 Family Brachyscelidae Stephensen, 1923
 Family Eupronoidae Zeidler, 2016
 Family Lycaeidae Claus, 1879
 Family Lycaeopsidae Chevreux, 1913
 Family Oxycephalidae Dana, 1852
 Family Parascelidae Bovallius, 1887
 Family Platyscelidae Spence Bate, 1862
 Family Pronoidae Dana, 1852
 Family Thamneidae Zeidler, 2016
 Family Tryphanidae Boeck, 1871
 Superfamily Vibilioidea Dana, 1852
 Family Cyllopodidae Bovallius, 1887
 Family Paraphronimidae Bovallius, 1887
 Family Vibiliidae Dana, 1852

Infraorder Physosomata Pirlot, 1929
 Parvorder Physosomatidira Pirlot, 1929
 Superfamily Lanceoloidea Bovallius, 1887
 Family Chuneolidae Woltereck, 1909
 Family Lanceolidae Bovallius, 1887
 Family Megalanceolidae Zeidler, 2009
 Family Metalanceolidae Zeidler, 2009
 Family Microphasmidae Stephensen & Pirlot, 1931
 Family Mimonecteolidae Zeidler, 2009
 Family Prolanceolidae Zeidler, 2009
 Superfamily Scinoidea Stebbing, 1888
 Family Archaeoscinidae K. H. Barnard, 1930
 Family Microscinidae Zeidler, 2012
 Family Mimonectidae Bovallius, 1885
 Family Mimoscinidae Zeidler, 2012
 Family Scinidae Stebbing, 1888

Distribution
Hyperiidea are known from many oceans of the world, including 69 species in the Southern Ocean.

References

 
Amphipoda
Taxa named by Henri Milne-Edwards
Arthropod suborders